Lysiosepalum aromaticum is a species of flowering plant in the mallow family that is endemic to Australia.

Description
The species grows as a thick, bushy shrub up to 0.75 m in height. The leaves are 20–60 mm long and 8–32 mm wide. The pink-purple flowers appear in November.

Distribution and habitat
The plants are found in the Avon Wheatbelt IBRA bioregion, east of Perth, in south-west Western Australia. They grow on brown loam soils over granite substrates, on slopes and moist areas at the bases of rock outcrops.

References

aromaticum
Rosids of Western Australia
Malvales of Australia
Taxa named by Carolyn F. Wilkins
Plants described in 2001